Acompsia syriella is a moth of the family Gelechiidae which is endemic to Syria.

Description
The forewings are straw yellow, mottled with black scales. The hindwings are grey.

Distribution
Adults have been recorded in mid May.

Etymology
The species is named after the type region.

References

Moths described in 2002
Endemic fauna of Syria
Moths of Asia
Acompsia